Greg Hughes (17 November 1939 – 15 May 2014) was an Irish Gaelic footballer who played as a full-back for the Offaly senior team.

Born in Cloghan, County Offaly, Hughes first arrived on the inter-county scene when he linked up with the Offaly senior team at the age of nineteen. He made his senior debut in the 1958. Hughes went on to play a key role for over a decade, and won three Leinster medals. An All-Ireland runner-up on two occasions, Hughes won one All-Ireland medal as a non-playing substitute.

Hughes represented the Leinster inter-provincial team on a number of occasions, winning three Railway Cup medals. At club level he played with Cloghan, St Rynagh's and Gaeil Colmcille, with whom he won two championship medals.

Throughout his inter-county career, Hughes made 36 championship appearances for Offaly. His retirement came following the conclusion of the 1971 championship.

His brother, Patsy Hughes, also played with Offaly.

In retirement from playing Hughes became involved in team management and coaching. At inter-county level he guided the Offaly under-21 team to Leinster success before later taking charge of the Offaly senior team. Hughes also trained the St Rynagh's senior football team.

Honours

Player
Gaeil Colmcille
Meath Senior Football Championship (2): 1966, 1968

Offaly
All-Ireland Senior Football Championship (1): 1971 (sub)
Leinster Senior Football Championship (4): 1960, 1961, 1969, 1971 (sub)

Leinster
Railway Cup (3): 1959, 1961, 1962 (c)

Manager
St Rynagh's
Offaly Senior B Football Championship (1): 1988

Offaly
Leinster Under-21 Football Championship (1): 1986

References

1939 births
2014 deaths
Gaelic football managers
Leinster inter-provincial Gaelic footballers
Offaly inter-county Gaelic footballers
St Rynagh's Gaelic footballers